Monster Mutt is a monster truck from West Chicago, Illinois, competing in the United States Hot Rod Association (USHRA) Monster Jam series since 2003. Originally styled after a 1950 Mercury, and later a custom body, the truck has a canine motif, complete with big ears, tail and tongue. It is painted in two tones of brown, with a dog mouth drawn in the front. The truck has three spin offs, two of which are currently competing. It is currently driven by Chris Koehler.

Truck History
Over the years the team has expanded with the addition of the Dalmatian and Rottweiler versions of the truck. It has competed in the World Finals every year since its debut, with Todd Frolik, Bobby Z, Charlie Pauken, all in the brown Mutt, Candice Jolly and Chad Tingler in Mutt Dalmatian, and both trucks will once again compete with Pauken and Jolly driving Monster Mutt and Monster Mutt Dalmatian, respectively. In 2010, Monster Mutt driven by Charlie Pauken went on to win the 2010 Advance Auto Parts NGK Spark Plugs Monster Jam World Finals Freestyle Championship in Las Vegas, Nevada and he got the highest jump of the night.  This was Monster Mutt's first ever World Finals Championship.

In 2016, the entire fleet of floppy eared fidos all received facelifts due to the update of the classic Mercury body style, now featuring three-dimensional teeth and real studded collars. A fourth truck, Monster Mutt Junkyard Dog, made its debut, but would be retired in April of the same year.

In 2019, both drivers Kaylyn Migues, and a new athlete Kristen Hope are driving the Dalmatian in 2 Triple Threat Series. Cynthia Gauthier is going to be driving the ice version of the Monster Mutt Dalmatian for a stadium series with 13 other drivers will compete to get an invite to the Monster Jam World finals XX in Camping World Stadium in Orlando, FL. She won the inaugural High Jump challenge with the height of 45.472 feet.

Other versions

In the 2007 season, Monster Mutt Dalmatian debuted. The Dalmatians are driven by Candice Jolly and Cynthia Gauthier. Chad Tingler drove it in World Finals 8 and 9. 

Candice Jolly started competing in the World Finals since 2009. In 2017 Randy Brown drove the Monster Mutt Dalmatian in the International Tour. Candice Jolly took the Dalmatian to this year's International Tour and Cynthia Gauthier took over for her for one event. For 2019 Cynthia Gauthier is going to compete in the Stadium Series 1 representing the Fire and Ice Version of the Monster Mutt Dalmatian. The same year on the Triple Threat Series Kaylyn Migues will be driving the Dalmatian on the Arena Championship Series as Kristen Hope makes her 2019 debut driving another Dalmatian on the Triple Threat Series.

In 2011,the Rottweiler version of Monster Mutt joined the Original and Dalmatian Mutt. It was piloted for a few years by Charles Benns (the rottweiler monster truck's original driver) and is now driven by former Team Grave Digger superstar Rod Schmidt. In late 2013, the Rottweiler got an aggressive new 3D body design for the 2014 season, that would serve as the inspiration for the other mutt's modern designs. In 2016, to 2019 the Monster Mutt Rottweiler is piloted by other drivers like Cory Snyder, Jack Brown and a few other drivers throughout the last couple of years.

In 2016, The Junkyard Dog version of Monster Mutt was introduced, and was driven by Dustin Brown. Unlike its predecessors, the truck retains the classic Mercury body that Monster Mutt was so famous for, this time with a rusty design. It only competed in that year.

Ownership
Monster Mutt, MM Dalmatian, Ice MM Dalmatian, MM Rottweiler, and MM Junkyard Dog are owned by Feld Entertainment.

Awards

Monster Jam World Finals
 2003

Driver: Todd Frolik
Racing: Lost to Sudden Impact in Round 1
Freestyle: Scored 9 - Last

 2004 

Driver: Bobby Z
 Racing: Lost to Maximum Destruction in Round 2
Freestyle: Scored 19 - Eighth

 2005 

Driver: Bobby Z
 Racing: Lost to El Toro Loco in Round 2
Freestyle: Scored 24 - Tied for Fifth with Superman

 2006 

Driver: Charlie Pauken
 Racing: Lost to Iron Outlaw in Round 2
Freestyle: Scored 32 - Third

 2007 

Driver: Charlie Pauken
 Racing: Lost to Batman in the Semi-finals 
Freestyle: Scored 21 - Tied for Eighth with Blue Thunder and Superman

 2008

Driver: Charlie Pauken
 Racing: Lost to Maximum Destruction in Round 3
Freestyle: Scored 27 - Seventh

 2009 

Driver: Charlie Pauken
 Racing: Lost to Captain's Curse in Round 3
Freestyle: Scored 26 - Tied for Fifth with Nitro Circus and Stone Crusher

 2010 

Driver: Charlie Pauken
 Racing: Lost to Bounty Hunter in Round 1
Freestyle: Scored 39 - First (Won its world title)

 2011 

Driver: Charlie Pauken
 Racing: Lost to Spider-Man in Round 2
Freestyle: Scored 9 - Seventeenth

 2012 

Driver: Charlie Pauken
Racing: Lost to Spider-Man in Round 1
Freestyle: Scored 16 - Tied for Eleventh with Maximum Destruction

 2013

Driver: Charlie Pauken
Racing: Lost to El Toro Loco in Round 2
Freestyle: Scored 12 - Fourteenth

 2014

Driver: Charlie Pauken
Racing: Lost to Wolverine in Round 2
Freestyle: Scored 10.5 - Tied for Eighteenth with Bounty Hunter

 2015 

Driver: Dustin Brown
Racing: Lost to Metal Mulisha in the Semi-finals
Freestyle: Scored 22 - Tied for Thirteenth with Avenger

 2016 

Driver: Charlie Pauken
Racing: Lost to Grave Digger in Round 1
Freestyle: Scored 24.5 - Ninth

 2017 

Driver: Charlie Pauken
Racing: Lost to Tyler Menninga's Grave Digger in Round 1 due to RED LIGHT
Freestyle: Scored 5.217 - Thirtieth

 2018 

Driver: Cynthia Gauthier
Racing: Lost to Gas Monkey Garage in Round 1
Freestyle: Scored 6.772 - Seventeenth

See also
 Monster Truck
 List of Monster Trucks

References

External links
Monster Mutt page on Offroaders.com
Monsterjam
Monster Mutt
Monster Mutt Dalmatian
Charlie Pauken
Mike Wine

Monster trucks
Off-road vehicles
Sports entertainment
Vehicles introduced in 2003